Clyde Edward Bradley (born January 30, 1934) is an American politician in the state of Iowa.

Bradley was born in Luke, Maryland and attended the University of Iowa. A Republican, he served in the Iowa House of Representatives from 1995 to 2003 (37th district), from Clinton County, Iowa.

References

1934 births
Living people
People from Clinton County, Iowa
People from Allegany County, Maryland
University of Iowa alumni
Republican Party members of the Iowa House of Representatives